Ellison Wentworth Quirk (8 July 186616 November 1938) was a New South Wales politician, Alderman and member of the New South Wales Legislative Assembly, representing the electorate of Warringah from 1901 to 1904.

Early life
Quirk was born in 1866 in the town of Lucknow, near Orange, New South Wales on the Wentworth goldfields, the son of Robert Quirk. Quirk grew up in the nearby town of Forbes until the age of 15, when his family settled in Manly in 1881. He eventually established himself within the Manly community as a Storekeeper and Land Agent. He married Margaret Ann Mills on 19 November 1896 and they had two daughters and two sons. Quirk involved himself in local politics at the time and identified himself with the Free Trade Party, not uncommon for members of the Sydney business community at the time. When Henry Parkes won the NSW Legislative Assembly seat of St Leonards in 1885, Quirk worked in his office.

Political career
Holding prominent positions as secretary of the Manly Fire Brigade and president of Manly District Ambulance Brigade, Quirk eventually stood for office as became an Alderman on Manly Municipal Council in 1896 and rose to become Mayor from 1901 to 1906. He would remain a Manly Alderman until his retirement in 1928. Quirk then stood for state office in 1901 when the local member for Warringah, Dugald Thomson, resigned so that he could stand for the seat of North Sydney in the new Federal Parliament. Elected as an Independent, Quirk was aligned with the government of the day led by Sir John See and Thomas Waddell. He served on a parliamentary committee that resulted in an act that allowed the extension of a railway to the Portland Cement Works.

He held his seat in parliament until it was abolished as a part of the reduction in size of the Legislative Assembly following federation, and contested the new seat of Middle Harbour (which absorbed the majority of Warringah) at the 1904 election. Quirk stood as an Independent Progressive but nevertheless lost the election to Dr. Richard Arthur 58-40%. Quirk then stood for election to the first council of the newly proclaimed Warringah Shire Council on 3 December 1906. Subsequently elected as an Alderman, he rose to be Shire President on three consecutive occasions in 1910, 1913–1914 and 1918–1919. He served on the Council until 1922.

Joining the Labor Party, Quirk attempted to re-enter state politics as the ALP candidate for Middle Harbour in the 1913 state election, but was again unsuccessful against Dr Arthur. The Sydney Morning Herald in particular noted with interest his change of party allegiance since leaving parliament: "Mr. Quirk's debut as a pledged [Labor] caucus candidate is, of course, something new for the electors to meditate upon. Whilst he was always considered a supporter of the Labour party, this is the first occasion on which he has accepted the conditions attached to the signing of the Labour caucus pledge."

In 1918, Quirk was one of seven Manly aldermen who were charged and found guilty for accepting free ferry passes from the Port Jackson and Manly Steamship Company. The magistrate convicted the seven aldermen of contravening the Local Government Act and disqualified them to act as aldermen. As the council only had a total of nine aldermen, there was a period when the council did not have quorum and therefore did not function. These convictions were overturned on appeal.

Eventually retiring from public life in 1928, Quirk died in November 1938 and was buried in Manly cemetery. Quirk Road in Manly Vale in the former Manly Council area and Quirk Street in Dee Why in the former Warringah Council area are named after him.

Notes

 

Australian businesspeople
Free Trade Party politicians
Independent members of the Parliament of New South Wales
Shire Presidents and Mayors of Warringah
Mayors of Manly, New South Wales
Members of the New South Wales Legislative Assembly
1866 births
1938 deaths
Australian Labor Party politicians
People from Manly, New South Wales